Sotra Sportsklubb is a Norwegian sports club from Sotra, Hordaland. Founded as Idrettslaget Øygard on 7 June 1945, the club's current activities consist of athletics, basketball, boxing, football, handball and gymnastics.

History

IL Øygard
Idrettslaget Øygard was founded 7 June 1945 in Fjell municipality at Sotra. 13 June 2007, IL Øygard met Brann in the second round of the 2007 Norwegian Cup. Brann won the game with the score 5–0. 

In 2009, IL Øygard merged with Foldnes IL and Brattholmen IL to become Sotra SK. Before the merger, IL Øygard's men's football team played in 3. divisjon (fourth tier), and played their home games at Straume Idrettspark. Their home kits were all-blue and their away kits were all-white.

Football
The men's football team currently plays in 2. divisjon, the third tier of the Norwegian football league system. They promoted from 3. divisjon in the 2018 season. In 2019, Sotra SK's senior football team were offered to join a merger with fellow Øygarden and Sotra clubs Nordre Fjell, Sund SK, Skogsvåg IL, Telavåg IL, Skjergard IL and Nest-Sotra to become a part of the new club Øygarden FK from 2020, but rejected because they wanted to continue on their own.

Recent seasons
{|class="wikitable"
|-bgcolor="#efefef"
! Season
! 
! Pos.
! Pl.
! W
! D
! L
! GS
! GA
! P
!Cup
!Notes
|-
|2013
|3. divisjon
|align=right|10
|align=right|24||align=right|8||align=right|4||align=right|12
|align=right|48||align=right|57||align=right|28
|First round
|
|-
|2014 
|3. divisjon
|align=right |2
|align=right|26||align=right|16||align=right|6||align=right|4
|align=right|64||align=right|26||align=right|54
||Second qualifying round
|
|-
|2015 
|3. divisjon
|align=right|2
|align=right|26||align=right|20||align=right|5||align=right|1
|align=right|85||align=right|15||align=right|65
||Second qualifying round
|
|-
|2016 
|3. divisjon
|align=right |2
|align=right|24||align=right|16||align=right|4||align=right|4
|align=right|66||align=right|32||align=right|52
||First round
|
|-
|2017 
|3. divisjon
|align=right| 5
|align=right|26||align=right|12||align=right|6||align=right|8
|align=right|57||align=right|48||align=right|42
||First round
|
|-
|2018 
|3. divisjon
|align=right bgcolor=#DDFFDD| 1
|align=right|26||align=right|17||align=right|5||align=right|4
|align=right|80||align=right|32||align=right|56
||Second round
|Promoted to 2. divisjon
|-
|2019 
|2. divisjon
|align=right |9
|align=right|26||align=right|8||align=right|6||align=right|12
|align=right|34||align=right|37||align=right|30
||Second round
|
|-
|2020
|2. divisjon
|align=right |7
|align=right|18||align=right|6||align=right|2||align=right|10
|align=right|21||align=right|34||align=right|20
||Cancelled
|
|-
|2021
|2. divisjon
|align=right |10
|align=right|26||align=right|10||align=right|3||align=right|13
|align=right|41||align=right|48||align=right|33
||First round
|
|-
|2022
|2. divisjon
|align=right |7
|align=right|24||align=right|8||align=right|5||align=right|11
|align=right|46||align=right|43||align=right|29
||Second round
|
|}
Source:

Head coaches

Handball
As of the 2019–20 season, the men's handball team plays in the third tier, and the women's team plays in the fifth tier.

References

External links
 Official site 

Football clubs in Norway
Sport in Hordaland
Association football clubs established in 1945
1945 establishments in Norway